The Church of the Holy Agony was a Roman Catholic parish church in the Roman Catholic Archdiocese of New York, located at 1834 Third Avenue and 101st Street, in the East Harlem section of Manhattan, New York City. The parish was established in 1930 as a mission of Our Lady of the Miraculous Medal. The parish is staffed by the Vincentian Fathers.

In November 2014, the Archdiocese announced that the Church of the Holy Agony was one of 31 neighborhood parishes which would be merged into other parishes. Holy Agony was to be merged into the Church of St. Cecilia at 125 East 105th Street.

The church was deconsecrated on June 30, 2017.

Buildings
A church and rectory at 1828-1834 Third Avenue was built in 1952 to the designs of architect Robert J. Reiley of 45 West 45th Street for $250,000.

References

External links
Harlem One Stop: Mass Times and photo
Catholic Churches of Manhattan Blog with description and photos
Parish directory

Roman Catholic churches completed in 1952
Christian organizations established in 1930
Roman Catholic churches in Manhattan
East Harlem
20th-century Roman Catholic church buildings in the United States